The Orderly is a 1918 American silent comedy film featuring Oliver Hardy.

Cast
 Billy West as Sanitarium orderly
 Oliver Hardy (as Babe Hardy)
 Leatrice Joy
 Ethel Marie Burton
 Leo White
 Joe Bordeaux
 Bud Ross

See also
 Oliver Hardy filmography

References

External links

1918 films
American silent short films
American black-and-white films
1918 comedy films
1918 short films
Films directed by Arvid E. Gillstrom
Silent American comedy films
American comedy short films
1910s American films